Collège Jean-de-Brébeuf is a subsidized private, previously Jesuit French-language educational institution offering secondary school and college-level instruction in Quebec. It was originally a boys' school but since 2014 admits both girls and boys.

The school is located at 3200 Côte-Sainte-Catherine Road. Collège Jean-de-Brébeuf is also a boarding school for college students wishing to reside at the college from Monday to Friday, and also during weekends.

Collège Jean-de-Brébeuf is commonly seen as one of the foremost schools in Quebec, and it has the seventh place in the Fraser Institute School Ranking as of 2020. In addition to government subsidies of roughly $4,500 per student every year, the school is able to maintain low tuition due to large class sizes.

With alumni Pierre Trudeau and Justin Trudeau, Collège Jean-de-Brébeuf is the secondary education institution that has produced the most Canadian prime ministers in the country. It also was the alma mater of Quebec Premiers Robert Bourassa and Pierre-Marc Johnson, and of Leaders of the Official Opposition of Quebec such as, André Boisclair and Pierre-Karl Péladeau.

History 
Collège Jean-de-Brébeuf was founded by the Jesuits in 1928.  The college was named after Catholic missionary and martyr Jean de Brébeuf.
The college traces its origins to the merger of several institutions which became public ones in 1967, when the Quebec system of public colleges was created. Built in 1928, the campus was designed by Dalbé Viau and Alphonse Venne.

It began accepting girls for secondary 1 to 5 starting from 2013 because of a need of funding. However, boys' and girls' classes take place in separate parts of the college before secondary 5. The school has been secular since 1986.

On May 4, 2016, a college student celebration on campus got overly rowdy: smoke bombs were thrown into hallways and some classroom windows were broken.

Programs 
Collège Jean-de-Brébeuf offers a number of two-year pre-university programs (unlike public colleges, it does not offer technical programs, which typically take around three years to complete and lead directly to certification for a specific trade or profession). Pre-university college degrees cover subject matter roughly equivalent to that of the additional year of high school given elsewhere in Canada in preparation for a chosen field of study in university.

Post-secondary students attending Collège Jean-de-Brébeuf can choose one of several programs of study, depending on the concentrations required for the university program in which they intend to pursue their studies. The college offers programs in Social Science, Literature & Communications, Health Science, Pure and Applied Science and Arts & Sciences.

In addition to the standard Diploma of College Studies, students in certain programs are also awarded an International Baccalaureate (IB) or Sciences, Lettres et Arts (FR) diploma (all-rounded preparatory for all university majors except music and dance, known as Arts and Science in English-language colleges).

Subjects taught in the secondary part of the school include  Mathematics, French, English, Ethics and religious culture, Gym, Art, Sciences, Geography and History. From secondary 1 to 4, three separate programs are offered to students: additional Sports, Latin, and International Baccalaureate. In secondary 5, in addition to the common core courses (i.e., the compulsory courses that all secondary 5 students must take), students choose from a combination of two optional courses: either physics and chemistry (the science combination) or modern European history and 20th century history (the history combination). Students must obtain a grade of 75% or above in science and mathematics in secondary 4 to be eligible for the science combination.

The secondary school curriculum has strong ties to the Cours classique (FR), the long-standing education system that was used in Quebec prior to the creation of the current system in the mid-1960s. Most notably, the study of Latin and the emphasis on logic and rhetoric still present in Brébeuf's curriculum are evidence of these ties.

Since September 2012, the school has offered an international program, which includes courses in Spanish.

Reputation 
Collège Jean-de-Brébeuf is widely regarded as one of the best and most prestigious secondary schools in Quebec. It has ranked number 1, tied with a few others, continuously for several years, and has consistently received high rankings (10/10) from the Fraser Institute for academic achievement. It is also placed as one of the best schools in the entire country.

Athletics 
The school is known for being very competitive in basketball, lacrosse and fencing, having won provincial titles in basketball several times and having many of its former students fence at international levels. The school also competes at provincial and regional level hockey, volleyball, cheerleading, broomball, cross country running, badminton and rugby competitions.  The school's lacrosse team has been in the finals for the four years it has played and has won the title three consecutive years.

Notable alumni

See also 
 List of colleges in Quebec
 Higher education in Quebec

References

External links 

 Official web page 

Education in Montreal
High schools in Montreal
Private schools in Quebec
Private subsidized colleges in Quebec
International Baccalaureate schools in Quebec
Educational institutions established in 1928
Côte-des-Neiges–Notre-Dame-de-Grâce
Jesuit secondary schools in Canada
1928 establishments in Quebec